Muffin Butte is a summit in San Juan County, Utah, in the United States.

Muffin Butte has been noted for its unusual place name.

References

Mountains of San Juan County, Utah
Buttes of Utah